"Candy Candy" is the second single by Japanese pop singer Kyary Pamyu Pamyu from her debut studio album Pamyu Pamyu Revolution. It was released as a digital download on March 13, 2012, and as a physical single on April 4, 2012.

Music Video 
Kyary states that the theme of the video is "80s idol singer" and that in the music video she wears a costume like "80's magical girl anime", like "Magical Princess Minky Momo", "Creamy Mami, the Magic Angel". In the beginning she runs in a hurry, being late for her appearance on a musical program. Running in a hurry with a slice of toast in the mouth is a stereotype from '80−'90s anime and manga, especially those for girls. When Kyary arrives at the stage, the program is already on air, and she immediately starts to sing and dance. She then takes a rest in her dressing room. Later on, a cosplay double of her with the same outfit, but with an anime mask, begins to dance in her place. Halfway through the second chorus, she then dropkicks it and continues the rest of the routine. In the end, she dances with her backup dancers as the double is still there dancing with them. 

The ranking table which rolls to show the names of songs is similar to one in a famous Japanese live musical program in the '80s, "The Best Ten".

Track listing

Charts

References

2012 singles
Songs written by Yasutaka Nakata
Kyary Pamyu Pamyu songs
Song recordings produced by Yasutaka Nakata
Unborde singles
2012 songs